Daniel Nathan Rubin was a playwright. Several of his plays were adapted into films. He wrote the screenplays.

His play "The Lion Trap" was adapted into the 1928 film Midnight Madness. He cowrote the screenplay for the 1931 film Dishonored and adapted on O. Henry's short story "The Double-Dyed Deceiver" into the screenplay for The Texan (film) (1930). His play "Riddle Me This" was adapted to film as Guilty as Hell in 1932.

Plays
Plays he wrote include:
"The Boomerang" (1914)
"The Upheavel" (1922)
"Claire Adams" (1929)
"Move On, Sister" (1933)
"Devils" (1926)
"Riddle Me This" (1932 and 1933)
"The Night Duel" (1926)
"The Lion Trap"
"Women Go On Forever" (1927)
"Night Club Scandal" adapted into the 1937 film
"Year of Delight" (1957)
"Desire on the Upas Tree Blooming" (1964)

References

American dramatists and playwrights
Year of birth missing
Year of death missing